Clube Carnavalesco Inocentes em Progreso is the fourth studio album released by Brazilian singer Ivete Sangalo, released on August 26, 2003.

Track list
From AllMusic.

Certifications

References 

2003 albums
Ivete Sangalo albums